Anauxesis elongata is a species of beetle in the family Cerambycidae. It was described by Brancsik in 1897.

References

Agapanthiini
Beetles described in 1897